Aghakishi beg was the khan of Shaki for a brief 4 year period.

Biography 
He was second son of Haji Chalabi and a son-in-law of Muhammad khan of Gazikumukh. Before succeeding his father, he was a viceroy of conquered territories from Ganja and Georgia. His reign abruptly ended when his father-in-law Muhammad khan and his naib for Arash Sultanate, Malik Ali killed him in conspiracy, capturing state treasure as well. As a result his nephew Muhammad Husayn fled to Aghasi khan, khan of Shamakhi who supported him with army to retake his throne.

References 

Shaki Khanate
1759 deaths